Barnett-Seawright-Wilson House, also known as the Fowler House, is a historic home located at Delphi, Carroll County, Indiana. It was built in 1857, and is a -story, transitional Greek Revival / Italianate style red brick dwelling. It has a limestone block foundation, gable roof, and measures 26 feet wide and 48 feet deep.

It was listed on the National Register of Historic Places in 1980.

References

Houses on the National Register of Historic Places in Indiana
Greek Revival houses in Indiana
Italianate architecture in Indiana
Houses completed in 1857
Houses in Carroll County, Indiana
National Register of Historic Places in Carroll County, Indiana
1857 establishments in Indiana
Delphi, Indiana